John Lister was an American football coach.  He served as the head football coach at the State Normal School of Colorado—now known as the University of Northern Colorado—in Greeley, Colorado from 1893 to 1896, compiling a record of 0–4.

References

Year of birth missing
Year of death missing
Northern Colorado Bears football coaches